Hanzaf may refer to:
 Hanzaf, Rafsanjan